St. Anselm's Ajmer is a school located in the city of Ajmer, Rajasthan, India. It was established in 1904 by the Rt. Rev. Dr. Fortunatus Henry Caumont, who was born on 10 December 1871 in France, and came to Ajmer to start modern education. St. Anselm's Ajmer was among the first institutions of higher learning set up during the British Raj. It offers senior secondary courses. It falls under the Roman Catholic Diocese of Ajmer.

Organization

Houses 
The student body is divided into four houses:
 Red
 Blue
 Green
 Gold

The houses compete against each other in academic and sporting disciplines, each contributing toward house points which count toward the "Best House" awarded to the champion house for the year. In 2022, Blue House won the "Best House" trophy in the Annual Sports Day

House tutors
Each house master is selected on the basis of his ability in sports, studies, and extracurricular activities. They have to select boys from different classes, at least 10-15 boys from each class. They have to change their group every year.

Prefects 
Prefects are appointed by the class teacher against class, as their representative.  Prefects have authority and privileges.

Curriculum 
St. Anselm's Ajmer designs and implements its own curriculum for classes nursery to VIII. Classes IX to XII follow the CBSE syllabus. Work is done in the library or outside the classroom and this is enhanced by the Council's own recommended structures. Every boy goes on for tertiary education for helping children with special needs.

Admission
Admissions are open to all boys and girls according to their caste or creed. Boys who are in the age group of between 2 years 8 month and 3 years 6 month will be admitted in nursery class. A corresponding age scale is fixed for the succeeding classes.

Session
The scholastic year begins on 1 July and ends on 30 June. The year is divided into two sessions or terms separated by the winter vacation. The summer vacation is from mid-May to 30 June.

Admission to Class XI
Students who have passed Xth class fill in a registration form for admission to faculties in XIth class. The subject-wise grouping in the streams is as under:
 Science: Compulsory - English Core, Physics, Chemistry. Optional - Maths/Economics, Computer / Biology.
 Commerce: Compulsory - English Core, Accountancy, Business Studies, Economics. Optional - Geography/Maths/Computer (Informatics Practices).
 Humanities: Compulsory - English Core, Political Sc., Geography, Economics. Optional - Hindi Core/Sociology.

Uniform
On class days and at school functions the boys wear uniforms.

Summer uniform
Light blue shirt (short sleeves), dark blue shorts (trousers for VI-X); white shirts with full sleeves and white pants for Classes XI and XII, white socks, black laced shoes and school tie.

Winter uniform
Classes K.G. to VII: V-neck blue woolen pullover and dark blue or worsted (dark) grey trousers. Classes VIII to XII: Navy blue blazer with school crest and worsted (dark) grey trousers.

Co-curricular activities
Students take part in games and athletics. Coaching is given in cricket, hockey, football, Table tennis, basketball, badminton and gymnastics. Every year players are selected for games at the state and national levels. Students are encouraged to join NCC (Air Wing) and Boys Scouts to develop their leadership skills. The school also has Cubs group for smaller children.

Notable alumni
 Naseeruddin Shah: Bollywood actor, director
 Vish Dhamija: Author author
 Rajeev Paul: Actor

References

Catholic schools in India
Primary schools in India
High schools and secondary schools in Rajasthan
Christian schools in Rajasthan
Education in Ajmer
Educational institutions established in 1904
1904 establishments in India